Colleges and Institutes Canada (CICan) is a national association formed in 1972 to represent the interests of its member institutions to government and industry. Membership is voluntary and open to publicly funded community colleges in Canada or institutions that may also be referred to as an institute of technology, CEGEP, or University with a college mandate. CICan currently has 142 member institutions.

Early history
CICan (formerly the Association of Canadian Community Colleges) began in Toronto with a temporary home in Centennial College. It was to be the voice of Canada's Colleges at a time when the very fragmented collection of 10 provincial systems was just beginning to emerge as a full partner in post secondary education. The focus was to be an  active promoter of access to learning for adults and community-based students not just in Canada but in developing countries. Early College Presidents such as Paul Gallagher (Dawson College), Doug Light (Centennial-George Brown), Gordan Wragg of Humber College and Yves Sansouci saw Colleges as an empowerment movement for less advantaged Canadians and brought the fervour of this mission to forming the Association. In this they borrowed heavily from the US Community College movement but went much further with their international determination.

Movement and growth
In 1991, CICan moved  to the nation's capital in Ottawa so that it could work more effectively to influence policy with the National Government on behalf of its members and also be closer to CIDA to create stronger developmental linkages between Canadian Colleges and counterparts in the developing world. CICan also needed to strengthen its effectiveness with Francophone members and Ottawa was a much more rational location to achieve this. With support from CIDA and contract success with ADB, the World Bank and others, CICan became one of Canada's largest international development contributors in the 1990s, applying the knowledge resources of its member institutions.  With partnership programs in the Caribbean, Asia, Anglophone and Francophone Africa and finally the newly freed nations of Europe, by the end of the 1990s the Association had helped build bridges and shared experience in building College and community based and employment centered  education with much of the world. Literally hundreds of Canadian College teachers in technology, business, health and other fields were able to strengthen less advantaged institutions in emerging nations. But the days of the college "movement" and the founders' energy to spread the message of accessibility and community responsive higher  education to all countries, were drawing to a close.

Recent history
Today, CICan has become very effective in service provision and representation of its members interests to a fuller range of Federal Ministries within Canada. It is now an important contributor to national human resources development policy along with its University counterpart, Universities Canada (formerly the Association of Universities and Colleges in Canada). It has developed a new focus on the links between industry and the Colleges and plays a useful role in this area. The price for this has been the slow decline of its international leadership in supporting the emerging skills training and adult learning institutions in the developing world. A second major cost of the more targeted focus has been the restructuring of its Board from that of constituency representation (students, faculty, administrators, College Board members and College Presidents from each region of the Country) to a Board of  Presidents only. The loss of this national forum for discussion of learning and the principles of inclusiveness  by the full range of partners in the institution was seen to be offset by the benefits of a clearer focus on financial and management issues. Finally, the sense of the uniqueness of the colleges has been blurred by their pursuit of degree granting status as they respond to the market demand of faculty and graduates for more prestigious visibility and higher academic status.

See also
 Higher education associations and organizations in Canada

References

Trade associations based in Canada
Higher education in Canada
College and university associations and consortia in Canada